Between is a preposition. It may also refer to:

Arts and entertainment
 Between (Frankmusik album), a 2013 album by Frankmusik
 "Between", a song by Jerry Cantrell from Boggy Depot
 Between (TV series), a Canadian science fiction-drama television and web series
 Between, a 2008 video game designed by Jason Rohrer
 The Between, a 1995 novel by Tananarive Due

Other uses
 Between, Georgia, an American town

See also
 In Between (disambiguation)